Two-time defending champion Steffi Graf defeated Mary Joe Fernández in the final, 6–3, 6–4 to win the women's singles tennis title at the 1990 Australian Open.

Seeds
The seeded players are listed below. Steffi Graf is the champion; others show the round in which they were eliminated.

  Steffi Graf (champion)
  Gabriela Sabatini (third round)
  Zina Garrison (quarterfinals)
  Helena Suková (semifinals)
  Jana Novotná (third round)
  Mary Joe Fernández (finalist)
  Hana Mandlíková (third round)
  Helen Kelesi (third round)
  Katerina Maleeva (quarterfinals)
  Natalia Zvereva (second round)
  Pam Shriver (third round)
  Larisa Savchenko-Neiland (first round)
  Raffaella Reggi (fourth round)
  Rosalyn Fairbank (third round)
  Gigi Fernández (fourth round)
  Barbara Paulus (fourth round)

Qualifying

Draw

Key
 Q = Qualifier
 WC = Wild card
 LL = Lucky loser
 r = Retired

Finals

Earlier rounds

Section 1

Section 2

Section 3

Section 4

Section 5

Section 6

Section 7

Section 8

External links
 1990 Australian Open – Women's draws and results at the International Tennis Federation

Women's singles
Australian Open (tennis) by year – Women's singles
1990 in Australian women's sport